The 1925 Cal Aggies football team represented the Northern Branch of the College of Agriculture—now known as the University of California, Davis—as a member of the Far Western Conference (FWC) during the 1925 college football season. The team was known as the Cal Aggies, California Aggies, and sometimes the Cal Aggies Mustangs. Led by third-year head coach William L. Driver, the Cal Aggies compiled an overall record of 5–3 with a mark of 2–2 in conference play, placing third in the FWC. The team was outscored by its opponents 98 to 81 for the season. The Cal Aggies played home games in Sacramento, California.

Schedule

References

Cal Aggies
UC Davis Aggies football seasons
Cal Aggies football